The Braid Valley Care Complex is a community hospital and care centre, situated on the Cushendall road in Ballymena in Northern Ireland. It provides services to the people of Ballymena and County Antrim and is managed by the Northern Health and Social Care Trust.

History 

The hospital has its origins in the Ballymena Union Workhouse and Infirmary which was designed by George Wilkinson and completed in 1843. The building cost £7,800, including furnishing of the interior of the building. On 3 November 1843, the building was officially declared suitable for opening. Following this, two weeks later on 17 November, the first inmates were admitted to the workhouse. The entrance block was subsequently demolished but the main building and the fever building survived and evolved to become the Braid Valley Hospital.

A business case for a new Ballymena Health and Care Centre on the Braid Valley Hospital Site was approved by the Department of Health in March 2012. The building, which was designed by a combination of Glaswegian practices Keppie Design and Hoskins Architects, was built by O'Hare and McGovern, who are based in Newry in Northern Ireland, at a cost of £25 million. Covering an area of approximately 9,000m2, it is the largest of its kind in Northern Ireland. The Health Minister, Simon Hamilton officially opened the new facility in 2016.

References

External links 

Northern Health and Social Care Trust
Health and Social Care (Northern Ireland) hospitals
Ballymena
Hospital buildings completed in 2016
Buildings and structures in County Antrim
Hospitals established in 1843
Hospitals in County Antrim
21st-century architecture in Northern Ireland